Carl Johnson Slone (February 6, 1937 – February 26, 2020) was an American college basketball coach. He was the head men's basketball coach at George Washington University from 1970–1974 and the University of Richmond from 1974-1978. Slone also played for the Spiders from 1957–60 and was a three-year starter at forward under head coach H. Lester Hooker. He led the Spiders in both scoring and rebounding as a senior.

Head coaching record

References

1937 births
2020 deaths
Basketball coaches from Kentucky
Basketball coaches from West Virginia
Basketball players from Kentucky
Basketball players from West Virginia
College men's basketball head coaches in the United States
George Washington Colonials men's basketball coaches
High school basketball coaches in Virginia
People from Pike County, Kentucky
People from Williamson, West Virginia
Richmond Spiders men's basketball coaches
Richmond Spiders men's basketball players
William & Mary Tribe men's basketball coaches